Uromyces elegans is a species of rust fungi in the family Pucciniaceae.

References

 Saccardo's Syll. fung. XI: xiii; XII: 819; XIV: 272

External links
 

 Aecidium elegans at MycoBank

Fungi described in 1895
elegans